Norman Tome (born 20 March 1973) is an Australian soccer player who represented Australia at the 1996 Atlanta Olympics.

External links
 Career Statistics at OzFootball
 

1973 births
Living people
Australian soccer players
Footballers at the 1996 Summer Olympics
Olympic soccer players of Australia
Bonnyrigg White Eagles FC players
Sydney Olympic FC players
Marconi Stallions FC players
Association football forwards